Ljungskile SK is a Swedish football club located in Ljungskile, a town within Uddevalla Municipality. They currently play in the Swedish third tier, Division 1.

History
Ljungskile SK, formed in 1926, is famous for their promotions between 1990 and 1997. In 1990, Ljungskile SK was playing in Swedish Division 5 and gained promotion to Division 4, Division 3, Division 2, Division 1 until they reached Allsvenskan in 1997.

The club soon gained sponsorship by the swimwear producer Panos Emporio after advancing for the first time to Allsvenskan (LSK defeated Umeå FC when attending the qualifying round in November 1996), and played under the name Panos Ljungskile SK from 1997 to 2002. The club was relegated two times (1997 and 2000) during these years, and played some years in Division 2 Västra Götaland before they managed to gain promotion back to Superettan in late 2004, defeating Väsby IK in the qualifying round. On October 21, 2007, the club gained promotion for the second time ever to Allsvenskan by defeating Landskrona BoIS away. During 2008 the club managed to replace IFK Uddevalla as Bohuslän's most successful club in the history of Allsvenskan.

Season-to-season

Players

First-team squad

Former coaches

  Johan Brinck (1995)
  Lars-Olof Mattsson (1996–97, 2006)
  Bo Wålemark (1998)
  Jan Jönsson (1998–2000)
  Lars-Gunnar Hermansson (2001–02)
  David Wilson (2003–05, 2006–08)
  Gudmundur Magnusson (2009)

Achievements

League
 Superettan:
 Runners-up (1): 2007
 Division 1 Södra:
 Runners-up (1): 1996

Footnotes

References

External links

Ljungskile SK – official site
Svenskafans.com – Supporter site (Swedish)

 
Football clubs in Västra Götaland County
Allsvenskan clubs
Sport in Västra Götaland County
Association football clubs established in 1926
1926 establishments in Sweden